This is a list of states in the Holy Roman Empire beginning with the letter I:

References

I